Ivaylo Stoimenov Yordanov (born 22 April 1968) is a Bulgarian retired professional footballer who played mainly as a striker.

During his career, he represented mainly Sporting in Portugal, appearing in more than 250 official games in one full decade and winning two major titles.

A Bulgaria international for nine years, Yordanov represented the nation in two World Cups and Euro 1996.

Club career
Born in Samokov, Yordanov began his career at local PFC Rilski Sportist, where he first appeared professionally at not yet 15, moving to FC Lokomotiv Gorna Oryahovitsa in 1989. In the last of his two seasons, he topped the First Professional Football League scoring charts, at 21 goals, helping lowly Lokomotiv to a comfortable ninth place.

In 1991–92, Yordanov joined Sporting CP, signing alongside compatriot Boncho Genchev – who had been his predecessor at Lokomotiv GO – where he would play in a variety of positions (including central defender, due to injuries to teammates). Persistent injury problems and the 1997 diagnosis of multiple sclerosis led to a 2001 retirement, still with the Lisbon club (he contributed with 11 matches and one goal in the team's Primeira Liga conquest the previous year).

Upon retiring, Yordanov stayed connected with Sporting, in its youth teams. On 7 June 2010 he joined Angel Chervenkov's staff at PFC Litex Lovech, as part of the scouting departments.

In 2017, Yordanov took up the role of director of football at his former club Lokomotiv GO.

International career
Yordanov was capped 51 times and scored four goals for the Bulgaria national team, including seven FIFA World Cup games in the 1994 and 1998 championships.

In the former, in another display of "team-first" attitude – and first discovering his versatile qualities – during the round-of-16 tie against Mexico (as Bulgaria prevailed in a penalty shootout) he filled in at centre-back, due to the absence of Trifon Ivanov (suspension) and Nikolay Iliev (injury). During the match, he set up Hristo Stoichkov's goal in the 1–1 draw.

Yordanov would also appear at UEFA Euro 1996, playing all three group stage matches (two complete) as Bulgaria finished third in their group.

International goals
Scores and results list Bulgaria's goal tally first, score column indicates score after each Yordanov goal.

Honours
Sporting
Primeira Liga: 1999–2000
Taça de Portugal: 1994–95

References

External links

1968 births
Living people
People from Samokov
Bulgarian footballers
Association football forwards
Association football utility players
First Professional Football League (Bulgaria) players
PFC Rilski Sportist Samokov players
FC Lokomotiv Gorna Oryahovitsa players
Primeira Liga players
Sporting CP footballers
Bulgaria international footballers
1994 FIFA World Cup players
UEFA Euro 1996 players
1998 FIFA World Cup players
Bulgarian expatriate footballers
Expatriate footballers in Portugal
Bulgarian expatriate sportspeople in Portugal
People with multiple sclerosis
Sportspeople from Sofia Province